|}

The Prix Isonomy is a Listed flat horse race in France open to two-year-old thoroughbreds. It is run at Deauville over a distance of 1,600 metres (about 1 mile), and it is scheduled to take place each year in October.

History
The event is named after Isonomy, a successful racehorse in the late 19th century. It was formerly held at Le Tremblay with a distance of 1,100 metres. It used to be staged in early September.

The race was transferred to Évry in the 1970s. For a period it took place in late October or early November. It was contested over 2,000 metres for several years, and shortened to 1,800 metres in 1990.

The Prix Isonomy was run at Saint-Cloud over 1,600 metres in 1996. It was run at Longchamp over 1,800 metres in 1997 and 1998.

The race was restored to 1,600 metres in 1999. For brief periods it was held at Maisons-Laffitte (1999–2000), Saint-Cloud (2001–02) and Fontainebleau (2003–04). It started a longer spell at Saint-Cloud in 2005, and was switched to Chantilly in 2012. Since 2015 the race has been run at Deauville in late October.

Records
Leading jockey since 1978 (5 wins):
 Thierry Jarnet – Subotica (1990), Mon Domino (1991), Sin Kiang (1992), Supreme Commander (1995), Onedargent (2012)

Leading trainer since 1978 (4 wins):
 Robert Collet – Son of Love (1978), Mon Domino (1991), Entre Deux Eaux (2008), Whip and Win (2010)
 David Smaga – Jazz Band (1979), Arneda (1983), Avaleur (1986), Peckinpah's Soul (1994)
 André Fabre – Subotica (1990), Sin Kiang (1992), Supreme Commander (1995), Al Wukair (2016)

Leading owner:
 no owner has won this race more than once since 1978

Winners since 1978

Earlier winners

 1907: Saint Caradec
 1908: Coronis
 1909: Vellica
 1910: Desiree II
 1911: Jarnac
 1912: Oukoida
 1913: Highly
 1920: Erdaraz
 1921: Evsonos
 1922: Black Prince
 1923: Fauche le But
 1924: Javoton
 1925: Evermore
 1926: Lusignan *
 1927: Herve
 1928: Fete Royale
 1929: Commanderie
 1930: Cristal
 1931: Madame du Barry
 1932: Reynolds
 1933: Rarity
 1934: Dulce
 1935: Ambrose Light
 1936: Barberybush
 1937: Blue Star
 1938: Coeur de Laitue
 1939: Colporteur
 1954: Relance
 1955: Chateau Latour
 1959: Imberline
 1961: Prince Altana
 1962: Nyrcos
 1964: Nasique

 Addis Ababa finished first in 1926, but she was relegated to second place following a stewards' inquiry.

See also
 List of French flat horse races

References

 France Galop / Racing Post:

 pedigreequery.com – Prix Isonomy.

Flat horse races for two-year-olds
Chantilly Racecourse
Horse races in France